Jelsi (or Jevze in local Molisan dialect) is a comune (municipality) in the Province of Campobasso in the Italian region Molise, located about  southeast of Campobasso.

Jelsi borders the following municipalities: Campodipietra, Cercemaggiore, Gildone, Pietracatella, Riccia, Toro.

Each year, the feast of Saint Anne is held here. It is also referred to as the feast of grain. Villagers are free to enter the float competition, in which case they must create a float out of grain, which can or cannot have to do with Saint Anne. If it is pulled by a cow, it is a traglia, but if it is pulled by a small tractor, it is a carro.

References

External links 

 
 Jelsi
 Feast of the corn
 Wheat community museum 

Cities and towns in Molise